Rides is the third album by the Somerset rock group Reef, released in 1999.

The album peaked at No. 3 on the UK Albums Chart.

Production
Recorded in California, the album was produced by George Drakoulias.

Critical reception
The Guardian deemed the album "a characteristic mixture of bluesy riffs and shrieking, with passages of quasi-metal played off against nearly-ballads with acoustic guitars for added 'sensitivity'." The Sun Herald thought that "Drakoulias's production is workmanlike but it's a frill-free style that sits comfortably with the band's meat 'n' potatoes arrangements."

Track listing
All music composed by Reef; all lyrics composed by Gary Stringer; except where noted.
"New Bird" – 2:33
"I've Got Something to Say" – 4:03
"Wandering" – 4:28
"Metro" – 3:24
"Hiding" – 5:27
"Sweety" – 3:39
"Locked Inside" (lyrics: Jack Bessant, Gary Stringer) – 2:59
"Back in My Place" – 4:11
"Undone and Sober" – 3:59
"Who You Are" – 2:51
"Love Feeder" – 3:38
"Moaner Snap" – 4:02
"Funny Feeling" – 6:10
"Electric Sunday" – 2:29

Singles
"I've Got Something to Say" #15 UK
"Sweety" #46 UK
"New Bird" #73 UK

Personnel
Reef
Gary Stringer – lead vocals, acoustic guitar
Kenwyn House – electric guitar, acoustic guitar, bass
Jack Bessant – bass, backing vocals, acoustic guitar, Nord Lead keyboard, organ, Taurus Moog foot pedals; lead vocals on "Locked Inside"
Dominic Greensmith – drums, backing vocals, tambourine, marching bells, Chamberlain organ, acoustic guitar
Additional members
George Drakoulias – tubular bells, backing vocals, theremin
Benmont Tench – Chamberlain organ, piano, organ, electric piano
Chris Trujillo – percussion
David Campbell – orchestral arrangements
Oren Waters – backing vocals
Maxine Waters – backing vocals
Julia Waters – backing vocals

Charts

Certifications

References 

1999 albums
Reef (band) albums
Albums produced by George Drakoulias